Earnest Ray "Bubba" Bean is a former American football running back with the Atlanta Falcons in the National Football League (NFL). He was drafted ninth overall in the first round of the 1976 NFL draft.  Bubba played three seasons for the Falcons between 1976 and 1979.

Career
Bean played running back in college for Texas A&M University. He was a four-year starter there. In his senior year, Bean was featured on the cover of Sports Illustrated. Bean rushed for 2,846 yards at Texas A&M.

In the 1976 season, the rookie rushed for 428 yards on 128 rushes for an average of 3.5 yards per carry.  Despite being sidelined for the entire 1977 season with a torn anterior cruciate ligament, he came back in 1978 to enjoy his best season, rushing for 707 yards on 193 attempts and catching 31 passes for another 209 yards.  His yards per carry increased each year, finishing with 4.5 in his last year on 88 attempts.  He was 1-for-2 in his career passing with one touchdown and one interception. In 1979, rookie William Andrews arrived and beat out Bean for the starting position.  Andrews rushed for over 1,000 yards that year and was selected to the Pro Bowl each of the following four years.

Bean retired from the NFL in 1982 to the Texas A&M career planning and placement office.  Twelve years later, he formed Bean Construction, which he operated for a number of years in College Station, Texas. Bean was inducted in the Texas High School Football Hall of Fame in May 2009.

References

Living people
1954 births
American football running backs
Atlanta Falcons players
Texas A&M Aggies football players
People from Jasper County, Texas